San Giovenale is the modern name of the location of an ancient Etruscan settlement close to the modern village of Blera, Italy. It was excavated by the Swedish Institute at Rome in the 1950s and 1960s with King Gustaf VI Adolf as one of the participating archaeologists. The excavations at San Giovenale has been, together with the excavations of Acquarossa, the main source of information about how small and medium-size Etruscan settlements were organized. The finds from the excavations are now partly exhibited in the Etruscan Museum of the Rocca Albornoz in Viterbo.

The site
The main settlement consists of high plateau split in two parts, normally referred to as the Acropolis and the Borgo. The settlement is surrounded by a number of burial sites. The excavations of the settlement were divided into eight areas: Areas A-F on the Acropolis, the Borgo and the Bridge over the Pietrisco.

PublicationsPublications 
The results of the excavations are published in the series Skrifter utgivna av Svenska Institutet i Rom-4˚ and in the Institute's journal, the Opuscula Romana (until 2007) and the Opuscula (2008-).

References

External links
 San Giovenale, The Swedish Institute at Rome
 San Giovenalo, Amministrazione provinciale di Viterbo

Etruscan sites
Former populated places in Italy